Adrien Bas (16 April 1884, in Lyon – 2 May 1925, in Lyon) was a French painter and pastellist. He was primarily known for landscapes, but also painted flowers, still-lifes, interiors and some portraits.

Biography
His father was a weaver. Except for some study trips and travels related to his health, he lived in Lyon his entire life. 

In 1908, he obtained honorable mention at the "Salon lyonnais des beaux-arts". After 1916, his works were largely inspired by Paul Cézanne, although he also admired Auguste Renoir. During the latter part of World War I, he stayed in Vence. Upon his return, he gained the patronage of the writer, sculptor and art dealer, who became his principal agent. 

In 1920, he participated in a major exhibit at the "Salon d'automne de Lyon" (modeled after the Salon d'automne of Paris), with a group of artists that included Louis Bouquet, Étienne Morillon, the sculptor, Marcel Gimond and many others who were opposed to Academicism. Shortly after, they were joined by the sculptor  and the writer, Gabriel Chevallier, creating a society known as "", that was active until 1924. Shortly before his death, he participated in the creation of the "".

He died of tuberculosis at his home on the Île Barbe. After his death, his works were promoted by his friend, the writer Henri Béraud.

Selected works

Further reading
 Alain Vollerin, Marjolaine Nardone, Charles Gourdin, Les Ziniars, éditions Mémoire des Arts, 2001 
 Paul Lintier, Alain Vollerin, Henri Béraud, Adrien Bas, une vie dédiée à la peinture, Mémoire des Arts, 2006

External links

Adrien Bas by Henri Béraud @ Solko
Adrien Bas @ Janine Tissot
Adrien Bas, peintre Lyonnais by Florence Charpigny @ Plumart

1884 births
1925 deaths
20th-century French painters
20th-century French male artists
20th-century deaths from tuberculosis
French landscape painters
French still life painters
Artists from Lyon
Post-impressionist painters
Tuberculosis deaths in France